The Lecanoraceae are a family of lichenized fungi in the order Lecanorales. Species of this family have a widespread distribution.

Taxonomy
Lecanoraceae was circumscribed by German lichenologist Gustav Wilhelm Körber in 1855.

Genera
According to a 2017 estimate, Lecanoraceae contains 791 species distributed amongst 25 genera.

Adelolecia  – 4 spp.
Ameliella  – 2 spp.
Bryodina  – 2 spp.
Bryonora   – 11 spp.
Cladidium  – 2 spp.
Claurouxia   – 1 sp.
Clauzadeana  –  1 sp.
Edrudia   – 1 sp.
Frutidella   – 3 sp.
Huea   – 25 spp.
Japewiella   – 7 spp.
Lecanora   – 550 spp.
Lecidella   – 80 spp.
Miriquidica   – 25 spp.
Myriolecis   – 34 spp.
Myrionora   – 2 spp.
Palicella  – 3 spp.
Polyozosia  – 42 spp.
Protoparmeliopsis  – 39 spp.
Psorinia   – 2 spp.
Pulvinora   – 2 spp.
Punctonora   – 1 sp.
Pyrrhospora   – 8 spp.
Rhizoplaca   – 11 spp.
Sagema   – 1 sp.
Sedelnikovaea   –4 spp.
Straminella  – 6 spp.
Traponora   – 5 spp.
Tylothallia   – 3 spp.
Vainionora   – 10 spp.

References

 
Lichen families
Lecanoromycetes families
Taxa named by Gustav Wilhelm Körber
Taxa described in 1855